The 1794 United States Senate special election in Pennsylvania was held on March 31, 1794. James Ross was elected by the Pennsylvania General Assembly to the United States Senate.

Background
The Anti-Administration Albert Gallatin had been elected to the United States Senate by the General Assembly, consisting of the House of Representatives and the Senate, in February 1793. In February 1794, the United States Senate challenged his eligibility for holding the office under the citizenship requirement and he was subsequently removed from office on February 28, 1794.

Results
Following the removal of Sen. Albert Gallatin from office after his eligibility was successfully challenged, the Pennsylvania General Assembly convened on March 31, 1794, to elect a new Senator to fill the vacancy. The results of the vote of both houses combined are as follows:

|-
|-bgcolor="#EEEEEE"
| colspan="3" align="right" | Totals
| align="right" | 87
| align="right" | 100.00%
|}

References

External links
Pennsylvania Election Statistics: 1682-2006 from the Wilkes University Election Statistics Project

1794 special
Pennsylvania special
Pennsylvania 1794
United States Senate 1794
United States Senate special
Pennsylvania 1794